Vekaria may refer to the following :

Place 
 Vekaria State, a village and former princely state in Sorath prant, Kathiawar, Gujarat, western India

Persons 
 Family name, with notable bearers 
 Shivlal Vekaria, Indian national MP for Bharatiya Janata Party, elected from Rajkot (Lok Sabha constituency), Gujarat
 Nanjibhai Vekaria, Indian national MP for Indian National Congress, elected from Junagadh (Lok Sabha constituency), Gujarat
 Radhika Vekaria, musician and composer
 Rohit Vekaria, cricketer